The National Fertilizer Development Centre (NFDC) is a multidisciplinary research and development organization at the federal level. The body was set up by the Government in 1977. NFDC works with Ministry of Planning Development & Reform of which Asad Umar is incharge.

Funding
After a brief period of aid from the United Nations Development Program it has been assisted by the Food and Agriculture Organization with funds from The Norwegian Agency for Development Cooperation and Agricultural Economics Institute (LEI), Netherlands.

International Cooperation
NFDC has collaboration and shares information with:
 Food and Agriculture Organization
 Agricultural Economics Institute (LEI), Netherlands
 Fertilizer Advisory Development and Information Network for Asia and the Pacific 
 International Fertilizer Industry Association
 Egyptian Fertilizer Development Centre (EFDC)
 International Potash Institute (IPI) 	
 Fertilizer Association, Cairo
 Fertilizer Association of India 
 Fertilizer and Pesticides Authority, Manila, Philippines 
 National Fertilizer Secretariat, Sri Lanka 
 Arab Fertilizer Association, Cairo

See also
 Planning Commission of Pakistan
 Agriculture in Pakistan

External links
 Official site

References 

Ministry of Planning and Development
Research institutes in Pakistan
Agricultural organisations based in Pakistan
Agricultural research institutes
Pakistan federal departments and agencies
1977 establishments in Pakistan